Kevin Paul Goodno (born October 22, 1962) is an American politician in the state of Minnesota. He served in the Minnesota House of Representatives. In 2004, he was the state's Human Services Commissioner. He attempted to prohibit food stamp recipients from purchasing candy and soda; that policy was rejected by the U.S. Department of Agriculture in May 2004.

References

1962 births
Living people
Republican Party members of the Minnesota House of Representatives